General Browne may refer to:

Beverley Woon Browne (1883–1948), Canadian Army major general
Edward Stevenson Browne (1852–1907), British Army brigadier general
Gore Browne (c. 1764–1843), British Army general
James Browne (Indian Army officer) (1839–1896), British Indian Army major general
Maximilian Ulysses Browne (1705–1757), Holy Roman Empire generals
Montfort Browne (fl. 1760–1780), British Army brigadier general
Reginald Spencer Browne (1856–1943), Australian Imperial Force major general
Sir Richard Browne, 1st Baronet, of London (c. 1602–1669), Parliamentary Army major general in the English Civil War
Sam Browne (1824–1901), British Indian Army general
Thomas M. Browne (1829–1891), Indiana Cavalry brevet brigadier general in the American Civil War
William M. Browne (1823–1883), Confederate States Army temporary brigadier general

See also
General Brown (disambiguation)